= Wat Chan Royal Project =

Agricultural development project in Thailand

Coordinates: 19.068224°N 98.291930°E

Wat Chan Royal Project (Thai: ศูนย์พัฒนาโครงการหลวงวัดจันทร์) is a development project in Chiangmai, Thailand, to replace opium production with other form of agriculture.

== History ==
At first the Royal Project Foundation researched and developed to find plant species that are suitable to replace opium cultivation and still satisfy market demand. The important thing that they need to do is to propagate any species to enough for agriculturist. From the experiment at the beginning founded that, there are many fruits that grow very well in the area of the north of Thailand. In 1979 the foundation of Royal project was selected the area of department of Agriculture at Pangda village, Samoeng, Chiangmai to be the experiment area for cereal and winter plant. However, when the demand of the plants was increased, this station can't produce enough plant for farmer so the foundation was decided to move to the new place that have the area around 25 rai and close to Plagung water reservoir. In 1985 the foundation was increased the area next to the primary area around 65 rai and was operated under Pangda Royal Project station (สถานีเกษตรปางดะ).

== Topography and climate ==
The Pangda Royal Project station is located at Pangda village in Samoeng district, Chiangmai, Thailand. The station is in a steep valley surrounded by plentiful forest. Its main water resource is the Plagung water reservoir. Due the station's location inside a valley 720m above sea level, the average temperature is around 23.0 degree Celsius. The highest temperature is 35 degree Celsius and the lowest is 9.5 degree Celsius. Annual rainfall is around 1,863.20 mm.

== Produce ==
Many types of vegetable are promoted by the Foundation such as two-color corn, bitter melon, eggplant, garlic chives, yellow sweet pepper, turkey berry. The station also researched fruits such as avocado, grape, Cape gooseberry, passion fruit, strawberry, and fig.
